The Andaman and Nicobar Cricket Association (ANCA) and the Cricket Association Andaman & Nicobar (CAAN) are sports organizations in Andaman and Nicobar Islands. Neither is affiliated with the Board of Control for Cricket in India.

References

Cricket administration in India
Organisations based in the Andaman and Nicobar Islands
Cricket in the Andaman and Nicobar Islands
Year of establishment missing